The 2014 FIBA Under-17 World Championship (Arabic: بطولة العالم لكرة السلة 2014 تحت 17 سنة ) was the 3rd edition of the FIBA Under-17 World Championship, the biennial international men's youth basketball championship contested by the U17 national teams of the member associations of FIBA.

It was hosted by Dubai, United Arab Emirates from 8 to 16 August 2014. This edition of the tournament was also expanded to sixteen teams. The preliminary round took place in Al-Ahli Arena and Al-Wasl Arena, with the Hamdan Sports Complex hosting the final round. This was the first FIBA U17 World Championship that was held outside of Europe.

The United States won their third consecutive title by defeating Australia, in a rematch of the last edition, 99–92 in the final.

Qualification
Sixteen teams had qualified for this year's edition.

2013 FIBA Africa Under-16 Championship

2013 FIBA Asia Under-16 Championship

2013 FIBA Americas Under-16 Championship

2013 FIBA Europe Under-16 Championship 

2013 FIBA Oceania Under-17 Championship

Host nation

Preliminary round
The draw took place on 12 February 2014.

Group A

|}

Group B

|}

Group C

|}

Group D

|}

Final round

Round of 16

9th–16th place classification playoffs

9th–16th place quarterfinals

13th–16th place semifinals

9th–12th place semifinals

15th place game

13th place game

Eleventh place game

Ninth place game

Quarterfinals

5–8th place playoffs

5–8th place semifinals

Seventh place game

Fifth place game

Championship

Semifinals

Third place game

Final

Final standings

Awards

All-Tournament Team
  Malik Newman
  Dejan Vasiljevic
  Nikola Rakićević 
  Isaac Humphries
  Diamond Stone

Statistical leaders

Points

Rebounds

Assists

Blocks

Steals

References

External links
Official website

  
2014
International basketball competitions hosted by the United Arab Emirates
2014 in Emirati sport
2014 in basketball
August 2014 sports events in Asia
Sports competitions in Dubai